William James Fanning (September 14, 1927 – April 25, 2015) was an American-Canadian catcher, manager and front office executive in Major League Baseball. Often called "Gentleman Jim", Fanning was the first general manager of the Montreal Expos of the National League (appointed in August 1968), and served the Expos in a number of capacities for almost 25 years.  As their field manager in 1981, he guided Montreal into the playoffs for the only time in the 36-year history of the franchise.

Playing and early front office career
Born in Chicago, Fanning grew up in the now unincorporated community of Moneta, Iowa, and attended its school, graduating with nine classmates in 1945. He played baseball for the Moneta Bulldogs and they earned a state runner-up title his sophomore season to Corwith. He later attended Buena Vista College in Storm Lake. In his professional playing days, he was a catcher who played most of his career in the minor leagues. He spent the 1957 season and parts of three others with the Chicago Cubs between 1954 and 1957, compiling an anemic batting average of .170 in 64 career games played, with no home runs and 24 hits. On Sep 14, 1957, in the second game of a double-header against the Pittsburgh Pirates, Fanning caught Cub pitcher Dave Hillman, playing on their shared 30th birthdays, the only known instance of a battery sharing the same birth date (that game, though, is more famous for the three home runs hit by Chicago's star shortstop Ernie Banks). 

Fanning then became a manager in the minor leagues, eventually joining the Milwaukee/Atlanta Braves organization, where in the middle of the 1960s he was promoted to the positions of Director of Minor League Operations and assistant general manager.

Fanning was briefly listed as a coach for the 1968 Braves, but before the season began he resigned to become the first director of the Central Scouting Bureau. Just months later, when his old Milwaukee boss, John McHale, became the first president of the expansion Expos, Fanning accompanied him to Canada as the Expos' general manager. Fanning and McHale built the Expos from scratch; in those days, prior to the era of free agency, newly formed clubs could only rely on expansion and amateur drafts and trades to build their talent base.

Building the expansion Expos
In the 1968 NL expansion lottery, Fanning drafted veterans such as Jesús Alou, John Bateman, Donn Clendenon, Larry Jackson, Mack Jones, Manny Mota and Maury Wills, and young players like Jack Billingham, Skip Guinn, Carl Morton and Bill Stoneman. He was forced to improvise when veteran pitcher Jackson, a five-time All-Star and winner of 194 career games, decided to retire rather than report; Fanning accepted shortstop Bobby Wine as compensation. Then he seemingly pulled off a blockbuster trade in January 1969, when he sent Alou and Clendenon to the Houston Astros for outfielder Rusty Staub, a two-time All-Star still only 24 years old. But Clendenon refused to go to Houston, and Staub declined to return there if the trade were cancelled. The matter took two months to settle, but was resolved when Fanning took back Clendenon and sent young pitchers Billingham and Guinn, with cash, to Houston to complete the trade.

Dubbed le Grand Orange, Staub became one of the early folk heroes of les Expos, along with fellow outfielder Jones and no-hit pitcher (and future Expos' executive) Stoneman. Most of the other veterans were soon traded: Mota and Wills were sent to the Los Angeles Dodgers on June 11 for veteran Ron Fairly, who became Montreal's regular first baseman four days later when Clendenon was swapped to the New York Mets for young players that included pitcher Steve Renko. The Expos improved incrementally over their first three seasons.

Overall, with opportunistic manager Gene Mauch at the helm, Fanning achieved a degree of success during his eight years as GM. In the mid-1970s, the Expos began to harvest players from their farm system, including Steve Rogers (1973), Gary Carter, Larry Parrish and Ellis Valentine, and Warren Cromartie and Andre Dawson. However, when Montreal regressed in 1976 and fell back into the NL East cellar, Fanning was replaced as general manager by Charlie Fox. Fanning then served in a number of front office posts with Montreal, including director of scouting, when, during the 1981 stretch run, he was called back into uniform. Manager Dick Williams, who had led the Expos into contention in 1979 and 1980, had alienated his players and clashed with the front office over his use of bullpen closer Jeff Reardon. With 27 games left in the season, Williams was sacked on September 8, and Fanning was named his replacement.  The move came as something of a surprise; he hadn't managed in almost 20 years.

Success and frustration as Expo manager
Fanning's calm and easygoing style favorably contrasted with Williams' hard edge, and the Expos won 16 of their last 27 games to capture the second-half NL East title, thus qualifying for the playoffs per 1981's strike-shortened, split-season format. The Expos then defeated the defending world champion Philadelphia Phillies in the first round of the playoffs to advance to the NLCS against the Los Angeles Dodgers. In the deciding fifth game, on what became known in Montreal as "Blue Monday" (October 19, 1981), Los Angeles outfielder Rick Monday hit a tie-breaking home run in the ninth inning off Montreal ace pitcher Rogers. The Dodgers won, 2–1, and advanced to the World Series, where they defeated the New York Yankees. None knew it then, but 1981 would represent Montreal's only trip to the baseball playoffs; in 2005, the club relocated to Washington, D.C., and became the Washington Nationals.

Fanning moved back into the front office, handing over the manager's job to Bill Virdon, recently fired by the Houston Astros. Once more, Fanning came down to the field and took over the club, but with poor (14–16) results, as the team finished a disappointing fifth.

Late career and death
Fanning, with a career major league managing record of 116–103 (.530), hung up his uniform at the close of the 1984 season and returned to Montreal's front office. He was succeeded as pilot by Buck Rodgers. After a brief stint as a color commentator on Expos radio and TV broadcasts, Fanning left the Montreal organization, working next as a scout for the Colorado Rockies prior to becoming an assistant general manager and then ambassador to amateur baseball/Canada for the Toronto Blue Jays.

He was elected to the Canadian Baseball Hall of Fame in St. Marys, Ontario, in 2000, and received his Canadian citizenship in 2012.

Fanning died as the result of a heart attack on April 25, 2015, at his London, Ontario, residence at the age of 87.

Managerial statistics

References

External links
 Baseball-Reference.com – career managing record and playing statistics

1927 births
2015 deaths
American expatriate baseball people in Canada
Atlanta Braves executives
Baseball coaches from Iowa
Baseball people from Ontario
Baseball players from Chicago
Beaumont Exporters players
Buena Vista University alumni
Canadian Baseball Hall of Fame inductees
Cedar Rapids Indians players
Chicago Cubs players
Colorado Rockies scouts
Dallas Rangers players
Des Moines Bruins players
Eau Claire Braves players
Fort Worth Cats players
Greensboro Patriots players
Los Angeles Angels (minor league) players
Major League Baseball broadcasters
Major League Baseball catchers
Major League Baseball farm directors
Major League Baseball general managers
Major League Baseball scouting directors
Milwaukee Braves executives
Montreal Expos announcers
Montreal Expos executives
Montreal Expos managers
Nashville Vols players
People from O'Brien County, Iowa
Portland Beavers players
Rock Hill Chiefs players
Sportspeople from Chicago
Sportspeople from London, Ontario
Springfield Cubs (Illinois) players
Springfield Cubs (Massachusetts) players
Toronto Blue Jays executives
Tulsa Oilers (baseball) players
Naturalized citizens of Canada